The Young Philadelphians: Live in Tokyo is a live album by Marc Ribot's Young Philadelphians which was recorded in Japan in 2014 and released on the  Enja Records Yellowbird label.

Reception 

Writing for All About Jazz, Mark Corroto stated, "The left turn here is Ribot's logical mish-mash (not an oxymoron) of classic Philly soul with elements of Ornette Coleman's electric Prime Time band. ... The disc is packed full of rump shaking steak and cheese party sounds". The Irish Times' Cormac Larkin stated, "The result is a boisterous romp of an album, like a disco recording from some dystopian, alternative universe".

Track listing 
 "Love Epidemic" (The Trammps) – 5:21
 "Love TKO" (Teddy Pendergrass) – 6:47
 "Fly, Robin, Fly" (Silver Convention) – 9:05
 "TSOP (The Sound of Philadelphia)" (MFSB) – 9:22
 "Love Rollercoaster" (Ohio Players) – 7:22
 "Do It Anyway You Wanna" (People's Choice) – 6:46
 "The Hustle" (Van McCoy) – 9:14

Personnel 
Marc Ribot, Mary Halvorson – guitar
Jamaaladeen Tacuma – bass
G. Calvin Weston – drums
Yoshie Kajiwara – violin
Takako Siba – viola
China Azuma – cello

References 

2015 live albums
Marc Ribot live albums